George Parker Scarburgh (February 11, 1807 – December 21, 1879) was a judge of the Court of Claims.

Education and career

Born on February 11, 1807, in Accomack County, Virginia, Scarburgh read law with Thomas R. Joynes in 1827. He entered private practice in Accomack County from 1828 to 1844. He was a judge of the Virginia Circuit Superior Court of Law and Chancery for the Third Judicial Circuit from 1844 to 1852. He was a Professor of law at the College of William & Mary from 1852 to 1855.

Federal judicial service

Scarburgh received a recess appointment from President Franklin Pierce on May 8, 1855, to the Court of Claims (later the United States Court of Claims), to a new seat authorized by 10 Stat. 612. He was nominated to the same position by President Pierce on January 22, 1856. He was confirmed by the United States Senate on February 11, 1856, and received his commission the same day. His service terminated on April 20, 1861, due to his resignation.

Later career and death

Scarburgh served as a Commissioner for the Confederate Court of Claims from 1861 to 1862. He resumed private practice in Halifax County, Virginia from 1863 to 1865, and in Norfolk, Virginia from 1865 to 1877. He was a judge of the Norfolk Corporation Court from 1877 to 1879. He died on December 21, 1879, in Norfolk.

References

Sources
 

1806 births
1879 deaths
Virginia state court judges
College of William & Mary faculty
Judges of the United States Court of Claims
United States Article I federal judges appointed by Franklin Pierce
19th-century American judges
People from Accomack County, Virginia
People from Halifax County, Virginia
Politicians from Norfolk, Virginia